The 2012–13 season was Lille OSC's 69th season in existence and the club's 13th consecutive season in the top flight of French football.

This season marked the opening of the Grand Stade Lille Métropole, with a 50,000-seat capacity that went on to host several matches of UEFA Euro 2016.

Players

Squad

Source:

Appearances and goals

|-
! colspan="15" style="background:#dcdcdc; text-align:center"| Goalkeepers
|-

|-
! colspan="15" style="background:#dcdcdc; text-align:center"| Defenders

|-
! colspan="15" style="background:#dcdcdc; text-align:center"| Midfielders

|-
! colspan="15" style="background:#dcdcdc; text-align:center"| Forwards

|-
! colspan="15" style="background:#dcdcdc; text-align:center"| Players who left the club during the season

|}

Source: Match reports in Competitive matches

Goal scorers

Last updated: 26 May 2013
Source: Match reports in Competitive matches

Transfers

In

Out

|}

Club

Coaching staff

Board

Kit
Supplier: UmbroSponsor(s): Groupe Partouche

Source: umbro.com

Pre-season and friendlies

Competitions

Ligue 1

League table

Results summary

Results by round

Matches

UEFA Champions League

Play-off round

Group stage

Coupe de la Ligue

Coupe de France

References

Lille OSC seasons
Lille OSC
Lille